Qirjako Qirko (born on  is an Albanian diplomat and former attorney. He is currently serving as the ambassador of the Republic of Albania to the United Kingdom of Great Britain and Northern Ireland (since 26 August 2016), and the Republic of Ireland (since 2018). Qirko is permanent representative of Albania to the International Maritime organisation.

Appearing before the Home Affairs Select Committee of the United Kingdom's House of Commons in December 2022, Qirko called for an end to a “campaign of discrimination” and warned against reinforcing negative stereotypes about Albanians after the British government discussed a rise in English Channel migrant crossings with Home Secretary Suella Braverman Albanian highlighting Albanian criminals during a debate. He described the recent Albanian migrants as economic migrants and Albania as a safe country.

References

External links
Qirko giving oral evidence to the meeting Beyond Brexit: the UK and the Balkans at the International Relations and Defence Committee.

Ambassador Qirko presents Letters of Credence to the President of Ireland

Dr Gëzim Alpion awarded the Albanian Nation's Ambassador Award [by Qirko] for research on Mother Teresa

Living people
Ambassadors of Albania to the United Kingdom
Ambassadors of Albania to Ireland
Permanent Representatives to the International Maritime Organization
1961 births